Andrey Viktorovich Gurulyov (born 16 October 1967, Moscow) is retired member of the Russian military and a deputy of 8th State Duma.

Biography

Military career

From March 2006 to June 2008 he commanded the 5th Guards Tank Division at Kyakhta. 

In 2010, after graduating from the Academy of the General Staff, Major general Gurulev was appointed Chief of Staff of the 58th Combined Arms Army of the Southern Military District.

In 2012, he became the commander of the same army.

In 2013 he was charged with abuse of power after forging orders and putting two conscripts into "labor slavery". The charges were dropped in 2014 because of the statute of limitations. Allegedly the object of the scheme was to furnish Lieutenant general Nikolai Pereslegin with servants and Pereslegin's daughter, whose company actively participates in bidding and receives government contracts, furnished the appropriate cover with the civilian labour authorities.

In 2014-15 Gurulyov was responsible for the 12th reserve command, whose sphere of activities under the 58th was to increase the territory of the Luhansk People's Republic and the Donetsk People's Republic.

From 2016 to 2019, Gurulyov served as Deputy Commander of the Southern Military District, and took part in the Russian military intervention in the Syrian civil war.

During the 2022 Russian invasion of Ukraine, he made it clear that in case of a world war, Russia would bomb London before Warsaw, Paris or Berlin.

Administrative and political career
In 2019 he left the military service and was appointed Deputy Governor of Zabaykalsky Krai.

Since September 2021, he has served as a deputy of the 8th State Duma.

In 2022 in an intercepted telephone conversation at 8:00 on 28 February 2022 he yearned to

Gurulyov is one of the members of the State Duma the United States Treasury sanctioned on 24 March 2022 in response to the 2022 Russian invasion of Ukraine.

On 30 August 2022 Gurulyov "encouraged Putin's regime to launch missile strikes on the British Isles", and said that "would be the end of the British Crown."

On 2 October 2022 he was talking about "system of lies going from top to bottom" and was suddenly disconnected from Skype.

References

External links 

1967 births
Living people
United Russia politicians
Russian nationalists
Russian conspiracy theorists
21st-century Russian politicians
Eighth convocation members of the State Duma (Russian Federation)
Russian individuals subject to the U.S. Department of the Treasury sanctions